Line 21 will be a future subway line on the Shanghai Metro. It will run in a north–south direction through Pudong, connecting Gaohang in Waigaoqiao to the Disney Resort. The first phase will be about 28 km long with 10 stations. Stations will have passing loops to allow for express and local stopping patterns.

The line was announced by the Municipal government in 2016. Previous plans in 2014 designated the Disney Resort — Guanglan Road section as Line 24.

History

Stations

Service routes

Important stations
The line will interchange with various lines in Pudong at the following stations:

Dongjing Road (Line 6)
North Yanggao Road (Line 12)
Guanglan Road (Line 2)
Zhangjiang Road (Line 13)
Disney Resort (Line 11)

References

Shanghai Metro lines
Proposed buildings and structures in Shanghai
Shanghai